See also may refer to:
 Citation signal, reference formats which often appear in technical, scientific, and legal documents
 cf., an abbreviation for confer, meaning "compare" or "consult"
 viz.